Joe Hune (born May 29, 1980) is a politician from the U.S. state of Michigan.

Education
Hune received his education from the following institutions:
Graduated, Fowlerville Community Schools, 1998
Graduated, B.S. Financial Planning, Cleary University
Attended, Agricultural Business/Animal Science, Michigan State University
Attended, Lansing Community College

Organizations
Hune has been a member to the following organizations:
Member, Howell Jaycees
Member, Livingston County 4-H
Member, Livingston Association of Realtors
Member, Livingston County Farm Bureau
Member, Michigan Association of Realtors
Member, St. Agnes Church

Professional experience
Hune has had the following professional experience:
Page, Michigan State House of Representatives, 1998
Agricultural Business Owner
Journal Clerk, Michigan State House of Representatives
Livestock Judge
Real Estate Agent

Hune had two terms as Michigan's 22nd District State Senator, a district which covers Livingston County (Brighton Township, Cohoctah, Conway, Deerfield, Genoa, Green Oak, Hamburg, Handy, Hartland Township, Howell Township, Iosco Marion, Oceola, Putnam, Tyron and Unadilla, the villages of Hartland, Hell, Fowlerville, Lakeland, Parshallville, Pinckney, and Whitmore Lake and the cities of Brighton and Howell) and Western Washtenaw County, (Bridgewater, Dexter Township, Freedom, Lima, Lodi, Lyndon, Manchester, Northfield, Saline Township, Scio, Sharon, Sylvan and Webster, the village of Manchester and the Cities of Chelsea and Dexter.) He last served as chairperson of the Senate Agriculture and Insurance Committees and on the Michigan Senate Health Policy, Regulatory Reform and Energy and technology committees.

First elected to the Michigan Senate in 2010 he took office in January 2011 as Michigan's 22nd District State Senator, a district which covered Livingston County and a portion of Southern Ingham County.  Hune was appointed as chairperson of the Senate Agriculture, Insurance and Redistricting committees, and serves on the Health Policy and Regulatory Reform committee.

Before become a state senator, Hune was in the Michigan House of Representatives from Michigan's 47th district Livingston County Partial.  First elected in 2002 to the Michigan House of Representatives at the age of 22, Hune lost by one vote after a re-count.

Hune is a vocal supporter of Donald Trump.

See also
Illegal immigration

References

External links
Project Vote Smart profile
Joe Hune's official website

1980 births
Living people
People from Livingston County, Michigan
Michigan State University alumni
Republican Party members of the Michigan House of Representatives
Republican Party Michigan state senators
21st-century American politicians